Dia Bridgehampton, previously known as the Dan Flavin Art Institute, is a museum in Bridgehampton, New York, opened in 1983 and run by the Dia Art Foundation. The museum houses nine fluorescent light works by Dan Flavin on permanent display, a gallery for temporary exhibitions, and a display on the history of the building. It is one of the locations and sites the Dia Art Foundation manages.

History
The building housing Dia Bridgehampton was built in 1908 as a firehouse. The fire department later moved out of the shingle-style building and The First Baptist Church of Bridgehampton occupied the building from 1924 through the mid 1970s. In 1974, the Dia Art Foundation was established by Heiner Friedrich and Schlumberger heiress Philippa de Menil, as well as Helen Winkler to help artists realize ambitious projects whose scale and scope is not feasible within the normal museum and gallery systems. In 1979 the Dia Art Foundation purchased the former firehouse and church building explicitly to house a long term exhibition of Dan Flavin's work as well as a rotating exhibition space. Flavin was a resident of Wainscot, a nearby town.

Over the next four years the building was renovated by the architect Richard Gluckman, under the direction of Flavin. Gluckman's first experience working with an artist was with assisting Flavin on a 1977 installation for the Dia founders Heiner Friedrich and Philippa de Menil, and his first commission to create a full scale art gallery was for the Dia Center for the Arts on West 22nd Street, now Dia Chelsea. The renovation of the former firehouse and church was sympathetic, acknowledging the past use of the structure but transforming the spaces so they could now be used as art gallery. The newel post was painted fire-engine-red and small gallery on the second floor was created to hold memorabilia from the renovation process including the church doors and a neon cross.

The building opened in 1983 as the Dan Flavin Art Institute with the building's vestibule and second floor dedicated to a permanent display of Flavin's work. The first floor was designed to be a rotating exhibition space and a print shop.

Without any physical changes to the structure occurring, Dia switched from calling this building the "Dan Flavin Art Institute" to calling it "Dia Bridgehampton" between a November 21, 2019 and a January 29, 2020 press release. Now, the "Dan Flavin Art Institute" is considered to only be the Flavin works inside Dia Bridgehampton, while the rotating gallery makes up the rest of "Dia Bridgehampton". One exhibit per year is displayed in this rotating gallery with a focus on presenting work by artists living or working on Long Island.

Dan Flavin Art Institute
The Dan Flavin Art Institute, within Dia Bridgehampton, consists of nine works in fluorescent light, as well as one drawing, all by Dan Flavin and all on permanent display. The institute opened with the building in 1983 and is a mini-retrospective touching on each of the major type of work he created with this medium. Dia expresses, in the pamphlet describing the institute, that the lights and the architecture should be viewed as a "single, continuous installation," and that "Flavin provided an experience built of provocative contrasts—between colors, intensities of light, structure and  formlessness, the obvious and the curious, the serious and the humorous."

The following table lists the works on permanent display.

References

Southampton (town), New York
Art museums and galleries in New York (state)
Contemporary art galleries in the United States
Museums in Suffolk County, New York
Art museums established in 1983
1983 establishments in New York (state)